Aurus may refer to:

 Baybugha or Aurus (fl. 14th century), Mamluk emir
 Aurus Mountain, a mountain in Namibia
 Aurus Motors, a Russian automobile company

See also
 Auris (disambiguation)